The Wayan Formation is a geological formation in Idaho whose strata date back to the latest Early Cretaceous and the earliest Late Cretaceous. Dinosaur, other reptile, mammal, and micro and macro-floral remains are among the fossils that have been recovered from the formation. The lack of extensive outcrops, limited geographic extent, and extreme structural deformation have limited paleontological explorations of the Wayan.

Geology and age 
The Wayan occurs in the Caribou Mountains of eastern Idaho.  Sediments are dominantly floodplain mudstones (many having undergone extensive pedogenic processes) with some fluvial sandstones and minor conglomerates, limestones, and tuffs.  Carbonate nodules in pedogenic mudstones suggest a semi-arid, seasonal climate during deposition. Radiometric U-Pb dates from detrital zircons indicate a latest Albian to early to middle Cenomanian age. Detrital zircon U-Pb dating within one stratigraphic meter of an Oryctodromeus locality yielded an age of 99.1 +1.5/-1.3 Ma showing proximity to the Albian/Cenomanian stage boundary.

The Wayan is equivalent to the upper Cedar Mountain Formation of Utah, the Aspen Shale of Wyoming, and the Vaughn member of the Blackleaf Formation of Montana.

Fauna and flora 
The vertebrate fauna is dominated by the small basal ornithopod Oryctodromeus, which dominates the vertebrate assemblage and is known from several partial skeletons.  An ankylosaur, a Tenontosaurus-like iguanodontid, a hadrosaurid, dromaeosaurs, a tyrannosauroid, a possible neovenatorid allosauroid, a giant oviraptorosaur (represented by eggshell of the oogenus Macroelongatoolithus carleylei), indeterminate small theropods, possible neoceratopsians, large and small crocodilians, turtles, a variety of small mammals, and semionotid fish are known from very fragmentary remains.

Fossil plants are rare, but petrified conifer wood, and foliage from angiosperms, conifers and ferns has been reported.

Vertebrate fauna 
 Cf. Semionotidae
 Eutriconodont mammal known from a tooth
 Multituberculate mammals known from teeth
 Metatherian mammal known from tooth
 Chelonia known from shell fragments.
 Crocodylians known from teeth and partial skulls.
 Oryctodromeus sp. known from numerous partial skeletons
 Indeterminate Tenontosaurus-like iguanodontid known from teeth
 Hadrosaurid known from teeth
 Ornithopoda indet.known from isolated skeletal elements
 Ankylosaur, probably nodosaurid known from partial skeleton and isolated elements.
 Neoceratopsia indet. known from associated elements
 Dromaeosaurs known from isolated teeth
 Tyrannosauroid known from an isolated tooth
 Tyrannosauroid similar to Moros and Suskityrannus, known from the proximal half of a femur
 Possible neovenatorid allosauroid known from an isolated juvenile vertebra
 Unknown small theropods known from isolated bones and teeth
 Giant oviraptorosaur known from eggs and abundant eggshell of Macroelongatoolithus carleylei.
 Large Allosaurus-size theropod, possibly piscivorous, known from isolated teeth

Macroflora 
 Gleichenia
 Anemia
 Angiospermae unidet.
 Coniferae unidet.

Taphonomy 
Taphonomic modes of the Wayan are distinct. Fossiliferous 'pods' of Oryctodromeus skeletons and skeletal elements, sometimes with more than one individual represented, are the most common occurrence of vertebrate skeletal remains. Degrees of association and articulation range from fully articulated individuals to articulated strings of vertebrae and articulate limbs associated with other elements. These Oryctodromeus remains exhibit no appreciable pre-burial taphonomic modifications such as weathering, abrasion, breakage, or tooth marks. This combination of observations suggests the possibility of burial of these animals within unrecognized burrows.

Excluding eggshell, almost all other vertebrate remains known from the Wayan occur as isolated teeth and partial to complete bones found in high energy fluvial lag and possible debris flow deposits. These remains exhibit a more typical range of taphonomic modification with varying degrees of abrasion and breakage typical of skeletal remains preserved in fluvial deposits. The overall fossil assemblage of the Wayan and patterns of preservation suggest that surface processes on the Wayan floodplains were less conducive to preservation, with preservation typically occurring subsurface and in fluvial channels.

See also 

 List of dinosaur-bearing rock formations

References

Further reading 
 Dorr, J. A., 1985, Newfound Early Cretaceous dinosaurs and other fossils in southeastern Idaho and westernmost Wyoming. Contributions from the Museum of Paleontology, University of Michigan 27(3): 73-85.
 Krumenacker, L. J., Scofield, G., Simon, J., Varricchio, D., and Wilson, G. P., 2014a. Outcrop envy: Paleontology and taphonomy of the Wayan Formation, the Cenomanian foredeep deposits of Idaho. Mid-Mesozoic: The age of dinosaurs in transition. Abstracts, Pp 63-64.
 Krumenacker, L. J., Varricchio, D. J., Wilson, G. P., and Robison, S. R., 2014b. The Robison Bonebed: A preliminary report on the most diverse vertebrate fossil site known from the mid-Cretaceous Wayan Formation of Idaho. Abstracts with programs, sixty-sixth annual meeting of the Rocky Mountain Section and the one hundred and tenth annual meeting of the Cordilleran Section of the Geological Society of America, 46(5):26, 14-6.
 Krumenacker, L. J., 2010. Chronostratigraphy and paleontology of the mid-Cretaceous Wayan Formation of eastern Idaho, with a description of the first Oryctodromeus specimens from Idaho. BYU MS thesis.
 Krumenacker, L. J., F. Jackson, J. Moore, S. F. Robison, and D. J. Varricchio, 2008. Preliminary paleoecologic and taphonomic observations on the vertebrate fauna of the Wayan Formation (Albian-Cenomanian) of east Idaho. Abstracts of papers, sixty-eighth annual meeting of the Society of Vertebrate Paleontology. Journal of Vertebrate Paleontology 28(3): 102A.
 Krumenacker, L. J., D. J. Varricchio, and F. Jackson, 2007. Vertebrate fauna of the Mid Cretaceous (Albian) Wayan Formation of Idaho, a possible correlate to the Upper Cedar Mountain Formation. Abstracts with programs, fifty-ninth annual meeting of the Rocky Mountain Section of the Geological Society of America. 39(5): 41, 19-4.
 Schmitt, J. G., and M. E. Moran, 1982.  Stratigraphy of the Cretaceous Wayan Formation, Caribou Mountains, southeastern Idaho thrust belt.  University of Wyoming Contributions to Geology 21:55-71.
 Simon, J. D. 2014. Giant dinosaur (theropod) eggs of the oogenus Macroelongatoolithus (Elongatoolithidae) from southeastern Idaho: Taxonomic, paleobiogeographic, and reproductive implications (MS), Montana State University.
 Weishampel, D. B., W. A. Akersten, A. D. McCrady, and M. B. Meers, 2002.  New Early Cretaceous dinosaur remains, including possible ceratopsians, from the Wayan Formation of eastern Idaho.  Pp 5–17 in W. A. Akersten, H. G. McDonald, D. J. Meldrum, M. E. Thompson (eds.),  And Whereas, Papers on the Vertebrate Paleontology of Idaho Honoring John A. White, Volume 2.   Idaho Museum of Natural History Occasional Paper 37.

Geologic formations of Idaho
Cretaceous Idaho
Albian Stage
Cenomanian Stage
Mudstone formations
Sandstone formations
Limestone formations
Conglomerate formations
Tuff formations
Fluvial deposits
Ooliferous formations
Paleontology in Idaho